HMS Yarmouth was a 70-gun third rate ship of the line of the English Royal Navy, built for the navy by a private contractor at Harwich under the 1690 Programme, and launched in 1695.

She was commissioned in 1695 under Captain James Moodie, and joined Berkeley's squadron. She sailed to the Mediterranean in 1696. In February 1696 she was under Captain William Whetstone, and in 1697 under Captain William Clevland. In 1702 she was in service under Captain William Prother, serving with Rooke's fleet at Cadiz in 1702 before proceeding to the West Indies. She took part in the Battle of Velez-Malaga on 13 August 1704.

The Yarmouth was broken up in 1707 and rebuilt according to the 1706 Establishment by John Wicker at his Deptford private shipyard, being re-launched on 9 September 1709. She served until 1740, when she was hulked at Portsmouth, being finally broken up in 1769.

Notes

References

Lavery, Brian (2003), The Ship of the Line - Volume 1: The development of the battlefleet 1650-1850. Conway Maritime Press. .
Winfield, Rif (2007), British Warships in the Age of Sail, 1714 - 1792. Seaforth Publishing. .

Ships of the line of the Royal Navy
1690s ships
Ships built in Harwich